Nicholas Nieland (born 31 January 1972 in Truro, Cornwall) is a British javelin thrower.

He was the British number three for many years. When his long-time domestic rival Steven Backley retired, Nieland rose to prominence to achieve a gold medal for England at the 2006 Commonwealth Games becoming number one in the UK.

His personal best is 85.09m set in 2000 and his best throw in 2006 is 84.70m. He won 4 national titles from 1996 to 2007, setting personal bests in the Olympic Trials in 1996 and 2000.

Nieland is a graduate of Bristol University with a BSc Chemistry 1994, and PhD Chemistry 1999.

Nick made his achievements in athletics from 2000 to 2007 while working as an equity analyst for a top investment bank in the City of London. After retirement he went on to become a strategic analyst for pharmaceutical firm Novartis, later joining the pharmaceutical research team of Citigroup.

Achievements

Seasonal bests by year
1995 - 76.30
1996 - 83.06
1997 - 78.76
1998 - 78.68
1999 - 83.68
2000 - 85.09
2001 - 82.93
2002 - 80.05
2003 - 82.97
2004 - 79.06
2005 - 79.56
2006 - 84.70
2007 - 79.04

References

Living people
1972 births
Sportspeople from Truro
British male javelin throwers
English male javelin throwers
Olympic male javelin throwers
Olympic athletes of Great Britain
Athletes (track and field) at the 1996 Summer Olympics
Athletes (track and field) at the 2000 Summer Olympics
Athletes (track and field) at the 2004 Summer Olympics
Commonwealth Games gold medallists for England
Commonwealth Games bronze medallists for England
Commonwealth Games gold medallists in athletics
Commonwealth Games medallists in athletics
Athletes (track and field) at the 2002 Commonwealth Games
Athletes (track and field) at the 2006 Commonwealth Games
British Athletics Championships winners
AAA Championships winners
People educated at St Edmund's College, Ware
Alumni of the University of Bristol
World Athletics Championships athletes for Great Britain
Medallists at the 2002 Commonwealth Games